ZenoRadio is a B2B and B2C radio service that distributes live, cloud-based, interactive broadcast content primarily through mobile devices. Founded in January 2012, ZenoRadio’s first iteration was as a radio dial-up service that allowed users to call-in-to-listen to radio broadcasts around the world. ZenoRadio is widely used by NYC taxi cabs drivers and by similar service industry professionals. The Manhattan-based private company provides a tool that functions regardless of Internet accessibility, via both "dumb" and Smartphone devices, (as well as directly online). ZenoRadio services more than 5,000 radio stations.

Background 

ZenoRadio is a free service that uses online streaming content connected through a U.S. phone number. Reportedly, it is the largest radio broadcast distributor for diaspora communities, or “homesick immigrants.” Broadcasters and listeners by and large hail from West Africa, Central Asia, and the Caribbean, and are now settled in the greater New York area. Ghana, Nigeria, Haiti and the Dominican Republic rank as ZenoRadio's largest ethnic media listener and broadcaster groups.

In 2013, ZenoRadio was a semi-finalist for a RAIN Internet Radio award for “Best Overall Digital Strategy.” RAIN recognized ZenoRadio for its free services accessible without Smartphone or a data plan.

The company beta-launched its newest product, ZenoLive, in the summer of 2015. ZenoLive is an interactive all-in-one, customizable interactive platform for broadcasters and hobbyists to produce and manage their radio content. ZenoLive is designed to allow broadcasters the ability to instantly engage with listeners and analyze their growth to better understand and directly connect with their audience, both individually and collectively. ZenoLive enables such features as broadcaster statistics, data, and trends.

References

External links 
 Official website

Internet radio in the United States
Companies based in New York City